40 Days and Nights is a 2012 disaster film loosely based on the 2009 film 2012. Produced by The Asylum and directed by Peter Geiger, the film stars Monica Keena, Alex Carter, Christianna Carmine, Emily Sandifer, and Mitch Lerner. It is a modern take on Noah's Ark and the Genesis flood narrative.

Synopsis

When a massive tectonic shift triggers a tsunami capable of swallowing whole continents, the military creates an ark capable of holding only 50,000 people and the DNA of every species possible while the storm consumes most of the world.

Cast
 Monica Keena as Tessa
 Alex Carter as John
 Christianna Carmine as Lynn
 Emily Sandifer as Maddie
 Mitch Lerner as Freeman

References

External links
 Official site at The Asylum 
 

The Asylum films
2012 films
2012 independent films
2012 science fiction action films
American science fiction action films
American disaster films
2010s English-language films
Apocalyptic films
Direct-to-video science fiction films
Films shot in Los Angeles
Direct-to-video action films
2010s disaster films
Noah's Ark in film
2010s American films